Tunisia (TUN) competed at the 1963 Mediterranean Games in Naples, Italy.

See also

Nations at the 1963 Mediterranean Games
1963
Mediterranean Games